Tomás Pochettino (born 1 February 1996) is an Argentine professional footballer who plays as a midfielder for Fortaleza in the Campeonato Brasileiro Série A.

Club career

Boca Juniors
On 8 November 2015, Pochettino  made his first team debut for Boca Juniors in a league game against Rosario Central, replacing Nicolás Colazo after 85 minutes.

Talleres
On 31 July 2018, Pochettino joined Talleres on a one-year loan with an option to make the move permanent. On 10 May 2019 Talleres confirmed, that they had acquired 50% of his rights and he would remain at the club.

Austin FC
On 11 February 2021, Pochettino signed for Austin FC of Major League Soccer ahead of their debut season. He made 31 appearances and 26 starts, scoring two goals and recording two assists. On January 10, 2022, the club announced it has loaned Pochettino to Argentina's River Plate for a one-year deal.

Fortaleza
On 6 January 2023, Pochettino transferred to Fortaleza for an undisclosed transfer fee.

Career statistics

Club

References

External links
 

1996 births
Living people
People from Rafaela
Sportspeople from Santa Fe Province
Argentine footballers
Association football midfielders
Boca Juniors footballers
Defensa y Justicia footballers
Talleres de Córdoba footballers
Club Atlético River Plate footballers
Austin FC players
Fortaleza Esporte Clube players
Argentine Primera División players
Major League Soccer players
Designated Players (MLS)
Argentine expatriate footballers
Argentine expatriate sportspeople in the United States
Expatriate soccer players in the United States
Argentine expatriate sportspeople in Brazil
Expatriate footballers in Brazil